The National Media Awards Foundation (NMAF) is a Canadian charity whose mission is to recognize excellence in the content and creation of Canadian magazines and Canadian digital publishing through two annual awards programs: the National Magazine Awards (NMAs) and the Digital Publishing Awards (DPAs).

Both events—The National Magazine Awards gala and the Digital Publishing Awards soirée—take place each June in Toronto. Each year the NMAF relies on over 100 volunteer judges to evaluate the entries and award gold and silver winners in the NMA written, visual, integrated and special categories and in the various DPA categories.

A 20-member board of directors mostly drawn from the Canadian media industry governs the NMAF. As of 2022, the president of the board of directors of the NMAF is Melony Ward, publisher of Canada’s History and Kayak.

History 
In 1976 Andrew MacFarlane, Dean of Journalism at the University of Western Ontario (UWO), was trying to revive the university's recently defunct President's Medal for Canadian Magazine Journalism. His original idea was to create a new award divided into English and French counterparts. But MacFarlane eventually developed a proposal for a series of magazine awards, whose salient features were that the program would be bilingual – and therefore truly national – and would recognize individual excellence in the many aspects of the magazine industry – writers, illustrators, editors, photographers and art directors.

MacFarlane together with John S. Crosbie, president of the Magazine Association of Canada, secured the participation of the Canadian Periodical Publishers Association (CPPA), representing 193 Canadian magazines, and CPPA's former president Michael de Pencier. MacFarlane reached out to his counterpart at Université Laval, Roger de la Garde, Alan Edmunds, head of the Periodical Writers Association of Canada (PWAC), and veteran newsman Pierre Berton, among others. As the collective effort began to take shape across the country, by the spring of 1977 the National Magazine Awards had developed a clear mandate.

On 14 November 1977, National Magazine Awards Foundation received its charter of non-profit foundation status from the Government of Ontario.

In 2015, the NMAF established the Digital Publishing Awards, to promote and reward the achievements of those who create digital publishing content in Canada.

The National Magazine Awards celebrated 40 years of awarding Canadian creators in 2017. The 40th anniversary event was co-hosted by Kim Pittaway, Michael de Pencier, and D.B. Scott. Alicia Elliott delivered the keynote address.

AS of 2022, the National Media Awards have been given to journalists, illustrators and photographers for 45 years.

First awards 
There were more than 1300 entries to the first National Magazine Awards for the year 1977. 62 judges evaluated the entries and awarded winners in 14 categories. The first National Magazine Awards gala was held on Thursday, 11 May 1978 at the Hotel Toronto.

Pierre Berton emceed the event, where the 660 guests dined and danced to Jack Collins and his five-piece band. Before presenting the awards, Berton proclaimed to the audience, "In a bold departure from tradition, there are to be no thank you speeches. We can do that because we are giving money, not some cheap statuette." If any winner started to talk on stage, Berton reportedly waved a large hook in the speaker's direction.

Awards were handed down in 14 categories (with separate French- and English-language winners for the President's Award for General Magazine Articles). 11 different magazines won awards. The NMAF also honoured outstanding achievement by a magazine: L'actualité (French) and Harrowsmith (English) took the awards.

Major winners of the National Magazine Awards 
The now-defunct Saturday Night is the all-time leader in awards, with 129 gold awards. Toronto Life magazine leads all current publications with 108 gold awards. Writer Robert Fulford is the all-time individual leader with 14 gold awards.

The NMAF also maintains a searchable archive of all past winners and tallies of magazines and creators who have won the most National Magazine Awards.

Categories 
The NMAF has a total of 29 awards categories, including 10 categories from the Magazine Grands Prix program. There are 4 types of awards categories:

Written Categories & Visual Awards: Long-Form Feature Writing, Feature Writing, Short Feature Writing, Columns, Essays, Investigative Reporting, Fiction, Personal Journalism, Poetry, Professional Article, Profiles, Service Journalism, Best New Magazine Writer, Illustration (incl. Spot & Photo Illustration), Portrait Photography, Lifestyle Photography, Photo Essay & Photojournalism, One of a Kind Storytelling.

Editorial Awards: Best Editorial Package, Art Direction Grand Prix, Editor Grand Prix, Cover Grand Prix.

Grand Prix: Best Magazine Awards: General Interest, Service, Lifestyle, Fashion & Beauty, Art & Literary, Special Interest.

Special Awards: Magazine Grand Prix, Foundation Award for Outstanding Achievement.

Magazine of the Year 

Each year the National Magazine Awards concludes with the naming of Canada's Magazine of the Year. Previous winners are:

1982: Equinox
1983: Vancouver Magazine
1984: Saturday Night
1985: Toronto Life
1986: Quill & Quire
1987: Report on Business Magazine
1988: Applied Arts Quarterly
1989: Toronto Life
1990: West Magazine
1991: Idler
1992: Cottage Life
1993: Owl and Chickadee1994: Canadian Art1995: Canadian House & Home1996: Canadian Living1997: Vancouver Magazine1998: Adbusters1999: Chatelaine2000: Azure2001: Canadian Geographic2002: Outpost Magazine2003: Border Crossings2004: Maisonneuve2005: Maclean's2006: The Walrus2007: Toronto Life2008: AlbertaViews2009: Up Here2010: MoneySense2011: Maisonneuve2012: Corporate Knights2013: Cottage Life2014: Nouveau Projet2015:Maisonneuve2016: Cottage Life''

Outstanding Achievement 
Each year since 1990 the NMAF has awarded the Foundation Award for Outstanding Achievement, which recognizes an individual's innovation and creativity through contributions to the Canadian magazine industry. The winners since 1990 are:

1990 Prue Hemelrijk
1991 Michael de Pencier
1992 Lloyd Hodgkinson
1993 Barbara Moon
1994 Don Obe
1995 Jean Paré
1996 Catherine Keachie
1997 James Ireland
1998 Robert Fulford
1999 Lynn Cunningham
2000 Peter C. Newman
2001 Ken Rodmell
2002 Al Zikovitz
2003 Sally Armstrong
2004 Paul Jones
2005 John Macfarlane
2006 Neville Gilfoy
2007 Charles Oberdorf
2008 Cynthia Brouse
2009 Terry Sellwood
2010 D.B. Scott
2011 Heather Robertson
2012 Stephen Trumper
2013 Kim Jernigan
2014 Michael Fox
2015 Kim Pittaway
2016 Penny Caldwell

Other information 
The submissions process for the National Magazine Awards is generally open from December until the second week of January. Nominations are announced in the spring, and the awards gala is held in June in Toronto.

References

External links 
 National Magazine Awards

Canadian journalism awards
Canadian non-fiction literary awards
Literary awards for magazines
Awards established in 1982
1982 establishments in Ontario